Craugastoridae, commonly known as fleshbelly frogs, is a family of New World direct-developing frogs. As delineated here, following the Amphibian Species of the World, it contains 129 species. They are found from the southern United States southwards to Central and South America.

Taxonomy
The taxon was created by Stephen Blair Hedges, William Edward Duellman and Matthew P. Heinicke in 2008. The taxonomy of these frogs is not yet settled, and other sources may treat the subfamily Strabomantinae as a family, Strabomantidae, with correspondingly smaller Craugastoridae. The family was rearranged in 2014, and more recently in 2021.

Life history
With the possible exception of Craugastor laticeps that may be ovoviviparous,
craugastorid frogs have direct development: no free-living tadpole stage is known; instead, eggs develop directly into small froglets.

Genera
Two genera are recognised in the family Craugastoridae:
 Craugastor Cope, 1862 (126 species)
 Haddadus Hedges, Duellman, and Heinicke, 2008 (three species)

Taxa formerly in Craugastoridae
The following two taxa were formerly placed in Craugastoridae, but are now incerta sedis within the superfamily Brachycephaloidea, awaiting more data to resolve their position:
 Atopophrynus Lynch and Ruiz-Carranza, 1982 (monotypic)
 Geobatrachus Ruthven, 1915 (monotypic)

References 

 
Amphibian families
Taxa named by William Edward Duellman
Taxa named by Stephen Blair Hedges